Tohmat  (English: Accusation) is a 2018 Pakistani drama serial directed by Shafqat Moinuddin which aired on Geo TV on Friday and Saturday nights at 7:00 p.m from 9 March 2018. The serial is written by Irfan Ahmed for Gold Bridge Media, and stars Nausheen Shah, Taifoor Khan, Yasir Ali and Momina Khan in lead roles.

Cast
Nosheen Ibrahim as Aila
Yasir Ali Khan as Aashir
Momina Khan as Naila
Tariq Jameel as Rafiuddin
Kainat Chohan as Sara
Manoj Kumar as Jahanzaib
Sohail Perzada as Ramish
Ghazala Butt as Rukhsana
Abid Ali as Saqib Baig
Taifoor Khan as Kamran Baig
Beena Chaudhary as Sumera
Sara Abdhullha as Sonia
Adil Abbass as Adil
Shazia Gohar as Parveen
Usman Patail as Sohail
Nazish Jahangir as Faiza

Soundtrack

The title song was sung by Sahir Ali Bagga & Maria Mir. And Sahir Ali Bagga also composed the music.

References

2018 Pakistani television series debuts